The Taganrog Old Cemetery is a historic cemetery on the outskirts of Taganrog's historical downtown district that was closed for new burials in 1971.

History
The cemetery was officially established in 1809 as a Christian cemetery, although the site has already had some burials. In 1810 the All Saints' Church in Taganrog on the cemetery's land was founded, which was consecrated and completed in 1824.

After Taganrog had been captured by the Red Army in late 1919, the cemetery was used for all interments. After the Second World War, several monuments and a traditional Soviet eternal flame were established on the cemetery territory.

On May 25, 1971 the cemetery was closed for new interments. In 1980's some of the older monuments were saved from destruction and desecration by being transferred into the inner yard of the Taganrog Museum of Art.

Current state
Despite the inclusion of the historic cemetery into the register of architectural monuments, it has been severely damaged, looted and littered.

Prominent people buried in Taganrog Old Cemetery
 Paul von Rennenkampff – Baltic German general 
 Saint Pavel of Taganrog (later relics transferred into St. Nicholas Church, Taganrog)
 Seraphima Blonskaya – Russian artist
 Lev Kulchitsky – Russian admiral, 13th Governor of Taganrog
 Konstantin Igelström – Decembrist
 Ivan Vasilenko – Soviet writer
 Alexander Lakier – founder of Russian heraldry
 Anatoly Durov – animal trainer

External links and references
 В.С.Кукушин, А.И.Николаенко "Таганрогский некрополь XIX–XXвв. Историко–художественный очерк", Таганрог, "Лукоморье" 2006
 Таганрог. Энциклопедия, Таганрог, издательство АНТОН, 2008

Buildings and structures in Taganrog
Eastern Orthodox cemeteries
Cemeteries in Russia
Cultural heritage monuments in Taganrog
Cultural heritage monuments of regional significance in Rostov Oblast